Tractor Corner is an inland rock point (the extremity of a spur) located  northeast of Repeater Glacier in the Asgard Range of Victoria Land. The spur marks the northeastern extremity of the Mount Newall massif near the snout of Wright Lower Glacier. It was named by the New Zealand Geographic Board in 1998 from the passage of tractors over Wright Lower Glacier en route to Wright Valley in 1967.

References

Landforms of Victoria Land